Shaikh Zayed Hospital, Lahore is a tertiary care Hospital located in Lahore, Punjab, Pakistan. It is attached with Shaikh Khalifa Bin Zayed Al-Nahyan Medical and Dental College as a teaching hospital and is part of Shaikh Zayed Medical Complex Lahore.

Recognition
 Accredited by the College of Physicians and Surgeons of Pakistan.

Chairman & Dean
Prof. Dr. Mateen Izhar a renowned Professor of Microbiology & Consultant Medical Microbiologist is currently serving as Chairman & Dean of Shaikh Zayed Medical Complex Lahore.

Administrator
Dr. Akbar Hussain is currently serving as Administrator of Shaikh Zayed Hospital Lahore.

History

The hospital was started as a donation from Shaikh Zayed bin Sultan Al Nahyan and people of United Arab Emirates. 
It was commissioned on 8 September 1986, 
Shaikh Zayed Hospital, Lahore

The hospital had 360 beds at the time of commissioning. In 2004, there were 713. Today, there are 1030. All the departments are recognized by the College of Physicians and Surgeons of Pakistan for FCPS training.

The Hospital now attached with
Shaikh Khalifa bin Zayed Al Nahyan Medical & Dental College (SKZMDC).

After devolution to Eighteenth Amendment in Constitution of Pakistan it has been devolved to Province of Punjab, Pakistan.

Facilities Available
 Accident & Emergency 24/7
 Department of General Surgery and Surgical Oncology (Providing a complete range of General Surgical and Cancer Surgery Services for all Solid Organ Cancers)
 Liver Transplant
 Renal Transplantation and Renal Haemodialysis.
 Central Intensive Care Unit (ICU) with Central Oxygen and Suction System
 Coronary Care Unit (CCU) Facilities
 Angiography, Angioplasty, Cardiac Bypass, Heart Valves Replacement and all sorts of Cardiac Operations and procedures
 Physiotherapy and Manual therapy on both indoor and outdoor basis
 Radio Isotope Cardiology, Thallium Scan, Echocardiography 
 Radiotherapy
 Latest Physiotherapy Equipment, Rehabilitation Center and Orthopaedic Workshop
 Neuroangiography, Electromyography (EMG), Electroencephalography (EEG) and all kind of sophisticated Neurosurgical operations
 Operations of Plastic Surgery and cosmetology Lip Augmentation, Rhioplasty)
 Operations of Fascio-maxillary, Jaw and Dental Surgery
 All kinds of Orthopaedic Operations
 All kind of Eye and Otorhinolaryngology Operations
 Surgical Operations of all kind for neonates, children, young and old patients
 Rheumatology Dept. The first dedicated indoor facility for patients suffering from auto-immune disease was inaugurated at Shaikh Zayed Hospital Lahore on Wednesday 14-Mar-2017.

References

External links

Location on Google Maps
Shaikh Zayed Hospital Online Appointments

Hospitals in Lahore
Teaching hospitals in Pakistan
Pakistan–United Arab Emirates relations